Bjurra is a 1970 Norwegian drama film directed by Kåre Bergstrøm, starring Henki Kolstad and Inger Marie Andersen.

Bjurra is an abandoned fishing village in Lofoten. One summer the place is visited by thirteen children from a boarding school, along with the caretaker Pedersen (Kolstad) and his wife (Andersen). When Mrs. Pedersen one day breaks her leg and needs to be hospitalized, the children themselves take over the care of the island. They make a newspaper, put up a play and establish a sports clubs. The children even write a constitution and select a municipal council and a president. In a short time Bjurra develops into a viable community, with caretaker Pedersen as honorary citizen.

External links
 
 Bjurra at Filmweb.no (Norwegian)

1970 films
1970 drama films
Norwegian drama films
1970s Norwegian-language films
Films directed by Kåre Bergstrøm